The Non-Life Master Swiss Teams national bridge championship was held at the summer American Contract Bridge League (ACBL) North American Bridge Championship (NABC).

This was a Swiss Teams event limited to non-Life Masters.

History
The winners have had their names engraved on the President's Cup, presented in 1942 by the then ACBL President Morgan Howard.

The cup was previously awarded to winners of the Non-Masters Pairs but was re-designated for the non-LM Swiss Teams by the ACBL Board of Directors in 1995.

Winners

Sources
List of previous winners, Page 8

1997 winners, Page 3

External links
ACBL official website

North American Bridge Championships